This is a list of shopping malls in Miami-Dade, Broward and Palm Beach counties (South Florida) in the U.S. state of Florida.

References

Shopping malls in the Miami metropolitan area
Miami
Shopping malls